Dihydrotestosterone butyrate, also known as androstanolone butyrate or stanolone butyrate, as well as 5α-dihydrotestosterone 17β-butanoate, is a synthetic androgen and anabolic steroid and a dihydrotestosterone ester that was never marketed.

See also
 List of androgen esters § Dihydrotestosterone esters

References

Abandoned drugs
Androgens and anabolic steroids
Androstanes
Butyrate esters
Dihydrotestosterone esters
Prodrugs